At Italy's instigation, a resolution for a moratorium on the death penalty was presented by the EU in partnership with eight co-author member States to the General Assembly of the United Nations, calling for general suspension (not abolition) of capital punishment throughout the world. It was twice affirmed: first, on 15 November 2007 by the Third Committee, and then subsequently reaffirmed on 18 December by the United Nations General Assembly resolution 62/149.  New Zealand played a central role facilitating agreement between the co-author group and other supporters.

It calls on States that maintain the death penalty to establish a moratorium on the use of the death penalty with a view to abolition, and in the meantime, to restrict the number of offences which it punishes and to respect the rights of those on death row. It also calls on States that have abolished the death penalty not to reintroduce it. Like all General Assembly resolutions, it is not binding on any state.

On 18 December 2007, the United Nations General Assembly voted 104 to 54 in favour of resolution A/RES/62/149, which proclaims a global moratorium on the death penalty, with 29 abstentions (as well as 5 absent at the time of the vote). Italy had proposed and sponsored this resolution.  After the resolution's approval, Italian Foreign Minister Massimo D'Alema declared: "Now we must start working on the abolition of the death penalty".

On 18 December 2008, the General Assembly adopted another resolution (A/RES/63/168) reaffirming its previous call for a global moratorium on capital punishment 106 to 46 (with 34 abstentions and another 6 were absent at the time of the vote). Working in partnership with the EU, New Zealand and Mexico were co-facilitators of the draft text which was developed over a period of six months, which Chile then presented to the UN General Assembly on behalf of cosponsors.

On 21 December 2010, the 65th General Assembly adopted a third resolution (A/RES/65/206) with 109 countries voting in favour, 41 against and 35 abstentions (another seven countries were absent at the time of the vote).

On 20 December 2012, the 67th General Assembly adopted a fourth resolution (A/RES/67/176) with 111 countries voting in favour, 41 against and 34 abstentions (another seven countries were absent).

On 18 December 2014, the 69th General Assembly adopted a fifth resolution (A/RES/69/186) with 117 countries voting in favour, 38 against and 34 abstentions (another four countries were absent).

On 19 December 2016, the 71st General Assembly adopted a sixth resolution (A/RES/71/187) with 117 countries voting in favour, 40 against and 31 abstentions (another five countries were absent).

On 16 December 2018, 121 voted in favor of the 7th resolution, 35 against, and 32 abstained.

On 16 December 2020, 123 voted in favor of the 8th resolution, 38 against, and 24 abstained.

International campaign

Hands Off Cain

The UN moratorium campaign was launched in Italy by the association Hands Off Cain, affiliated to the Nonviolent Radical Party. The association against death penalty and torture was founded in Rome in 1993 by former left-wing terrorist and current nonviolent politician and human rights activist Sergio D'Elia, with his first wife Mariateresa Di Lascia and Italian Radicals' liberal leaders Marco Pannella and Emma Bonino (former European Commissioner).

History
In 1994, a resolution for a moratorium was presented for the first time at the United Nations General Assembly (UNGA) by the Italian government. It lost by eight votes. Since 1997, through Italy's initiative, and since 1999 through the EU's endeavour, the United Nations Commission on Human Rights (UNCHR) has been approving a resolution calling for a moratorium on executions with a view to completely abolishing the death penalty, every year. The 2007 vote at the Third Committee of the United Nations General Assembly saw intense diplomatic activity in favour of the moratorium by EU countries, and by the Nonviolent Radical Party itself; the Catholic Community of Sant'Egidio joined forces by submitting to the U.N. an appeal and 5,000,000 signatures asking for the moratorium to be passed..

Full text of resolution 62/149

Full text of resolution 63/168

Full text of resolution 65/206

See also
International Commission Against the Death Penalty
World Coalition Against the Death Penalty

Notes

External links
 Moratoria: Death Penalty Worldwide Academic research database on the laws, practice, and statistics of capital punishment for every death penalty country in the world.
 HandsOffCain.info – official website of Hands Off Cain

Moratorium on the Death Penalty
Moratorium on the Death Penalty
Moratorium on the Death Penalty
2007 in the United Nations
2008 in the United Nations
2010 in the United Nations